Allow Me to Re-Introduce Myself, also known as AMTRIM, is a collaborative mixtape album by Canadian rapper Kardinal Offishall and American hip hop producer Nottz, released June 15, 2012. Originally recorded as a studio album, they decided to release it as a free download for their fans.

Background
Kardinal began working with Nottz in 2002, and their first collaboration, "Sick!", was released the following year as a B-side of Kardinal's "Belly Dancer" single. Since then, they've collaborated numerous times, with Nottz's production appearing on Kardinal's Kill Bloodclott Bill mixtape and Not 4 Sale album, and with Kardinal making appearances on Nottz's You Need This Music album and Rawth EP (with Asher Roth).

The project was announced in early 2011. Originally titled Seven, Kardinal and Nottz recorded it in seven days, though some tracks were added later. Lyrical themes on the mixtape range from gun violence in Toronto on "Kill Shot", to education on "Mr. Parker"; both songs spawned music videos. The mixtape features shoutouts from several notable hip hop artists and producers, including Bun B, DJ Green Lantern, Boi-1da, and Pete Rock, among others.

Reception 

Urbanology Magazine gave the mixtape a favorable review, stating that it "combines Nottz' cartoonish beats and Kardi's animated flow making for a perfect match," also calling it "a great reintroduction to familiar faces."

Track listing 
All songs produced by Nottz.

Samples
"Kill Shot" contains excerpts from the film Date Night
"Mr. Parker" contains a sample of "I Want You Back (A cappella)" by The Jackson 5
"I Wish I Could Talk to You" contains a sample of "Wish That I Could Talk to You" by The Sylvers

References 

2012 mixtape albums
Albums produced by Nottz
Collaborative albums
Kardinal Offishall albums